"Chaise Électrique" is a song recorded by Congolese singer Fally Ipupa, from his third studio album Arsenal De Belles Melodies (2009).  It was released with the album, along with the video. It is the most notable song of Ipupa's album, for the participation of R&B singer and former G-Unit member Olivia. The video to Chaise Électrique was recorded in France.

See also

Koffi Olomide
Ferre Gola
Mokobé
Lynnsha
Passi
Youssoupha

References

External links
   (YouTube)

2013 singles
Fally Ipupa songs
2009 songs